Paxillus obscurisporus is a basidiomycete fungus found in Europe. It was described as new to science in 1999. It was originally given the name P. obscurosporus which was later corrected to  'obscurisporus' .

References

External links

Paxillaceae
Fungi described in 1999
Fungi of Europe